PPCS may refer to:
PPCS (gene)
Persistent post concussion syndrome
PictureParentControlSet (data structure)